The 1995 Waveney District Council election took place on 4 May 1995 to elect members of Waveney District Council in England. This was on the same day as other local elections.

Summary

Ward results

Beccles Town

Beccles Worlingham

Blything

Bungay

Carlton

Gunton

Halesworth

Harbour

Kirkley

Lothingland

Normanston

Oulton Broad

Pakefield

Southwold

St. Margaret's

Whitton

References

1995 English local elections
May 1995 events in the United Kingdom
1995
1990s in Suffolk